In mathematics, an affine Hecke algebra is the algebra associated to an affine Weyl group, and can be used to prove Macdonald's constant term conjecture for Macdonald polynomials.

Definition

Generalizations
Ivan Cherednik introduced generalizations of affine Hecke algebras, the so-called double affine Hecke algebra (usually referred to as DAHA). Using this he was able to give a proof of Macdonald's constant term conjecture for Macdonald polynomials (building on work of Eric Opdam). Another main inspiration for Cherednik to consider the double affine Hecke algebra was the quantum KZ equations.

References

Algebras
Representation theory